Thomas Ceccon (born 27 January 2001) is an Italian swimmer. He is a world record holder in the long course 100 metre backstroke and the short course 4×100 metre freestyle relay. He is also the Italian record holder in the long course 50 metre backstroke and 50 metre butterfly. He is the 2022 World champion in the 100 metre backstroke and 2022 European champion in the 100 metre backstroke and 50 metre butterfly. In the 100 metre individual medley, he won the gold medal at the 2022 World Short Course Championships and the bronze medal at the 2021 World Short Course Championships. At the 2020 Summer Olympics, he won a silver medal in 4×100 metre freestyle relay, a bronze medal in the 4×100 metre medley relay, placed fourth in the 100 metre bacsktroke, and placed twelfth in the 100 metre freestyle.

Background
Ceccon was born in Thiene, in the province of Vicenza, Italy on 27 January 2001. He trains under the guidance of coach Alberto Burlina for Gruppo Sportivo Fiamme Oro. He has detained the Italian record in the long course 100 metre backstroke, since 17 December 2020, starting with a 52.84.

Career
He won the 50 m free style Youth Olympic title and 4 other medals at 2018 Youth Olympic Games in Buenos Aires.
He participated to the 2019 World Aquatics Championships.
He won two gold medals at the 2019 FINA World Junior Swimming Championships.

2021

2020 Summer Olympics

At the 2020 Summer Olympics, held in 2021 due to the COVID-19 pandemic and contested in Tokyo, Japan, Ceccon won a silver medal in the 4×100 metre freestyle relay on the second day of competition, contributing a split of 47.45 seconds for the second leg of the relay to help finish second in an Italian record time of 3:10.11. For the 100 metre backstroke, he placed fourth in the morning final on day three with an Italian record time of 52.30 seconds, after setting an Italian record of 52.49 seconds in the preliminary heats on day one. In the evening of day three, he swam a personal best time of 47.71 seconds in the preliminary heats of the 100 metre freestyle to qualify for the semifinals ranking first. The following day, in the semifinals, he went on to place twelfth with a time of 48.05 seconds, which was 0.94 seconds slower than the fastest swimmer in the semifinals Kliment Kolesnikov of Russia, and did not advance to the event final.

On 31 July, Ceccon helped achieve a fourth-place finish in the 4×100 metre mixed medley relay, swimming the backstroke portion of the relay in 52.23 seconds to contribute to the final mark, and Italian record time, of 3:39.28. The following day, he won a bronze medal as part of the 4×100 metre medley relay, finishing in an Italian record time of 3:29.17 with finals relay teammates Nicolò Martinenghi (breaststroke), Federico Burdisso (butterfly), and Alessandro Miressi (freestyle).

2021 World Short Course Championships
On day one of the 2021 World Short Course Championships, held in December at Etihad Arena in Abu Dhabi, United Arab Emirates, Ceccon placed ninth in the semifinals of the 100 metre backstroke with a time of 50.22 seconds. In the same session, he split a 45.71 for the second leg of the 4×100 metre freestyle relay to help win the silver medal in an Italian record time of 3:03.61. Three days later, he started the evening session off with a bronze medal in the 100 metre individual medley with a time of 51.40 seconds and a placing of twelfth in the semifinals of the 50 metre butterfly with a time of 22.74 seconds. For his third and final event of the evening, he helped set a new Italian record of 6:51.48 in the final of the 4×200 metre freestyle relay to place fourth, splitting a 1:44.23 for the second leg of the relay. The second-to-last day of competition, he won a bronze medal in the 4×50 metre medley relay, contributing a split of 21.11 for the freestyle leg of the relay in the preliminaries before being substituted out for Lorenzo Zazzeri in the final. On the final day, he split a 50.96 for the backstroke portion of the 4×100 metre medley relay in the preliminaries before Lorenzo Mora substituted in for him on the finals relay and all relay members won a gold medal when the finals relay finished first in 3:19.76.

2022

2022 World Aquatics Championships
At the 2022 World Aquatics Championships, held in June in Budapest, Hungary, Ceccon won a bronze medal as part of the 4×100 metre freestyle relay on the first day of pool swimming competition. For the 50 metre butterfly, Ceccon placed fifth in the final on day two with a time of 22.86 seconds, after setting a new Italian record time of 22.79 seconds in the semifinals to qualify for the final ranking second. One day later, day three, he won the gold medal in the 100 metre backstroke with a world record time of 51.60 seconds. His world record was the first world record set in swimming at the 2022 World Aquatics Championships. On the fourth day, he helped place fifth in the 4×100 metre mixed medley relay, leading off the relay with a 52.26 for the backstroke portion of the relay to contribute to the final time of 3:41.67.

In the 50 metre backstroke final on day eight, Ceccon won the bronze medal and received his medal at the medals ceremony before a swimmer from the United States who was disqualified for an illegal finish during the race had his disqualification overturned and bumped the bronze medal from Ceccon to Ksawery Masiuk of Poland. The same day, he won a gold medal in the 4×100 metre medley relay, splitting a 51.93 for the backstroke leg of the relay in the final to help achieve a European record time of 3:27.51.

2022 European Aquatics Championships
Two months later, at the 2022 European Aquatics Championships in Rome, Ceccon qualified for the semifinals of the 50 metre butterfly ranking fifth with a time of 23.38 seconds in the morning preliminaries on day one. Speeding up to a 23.14 in the semifinals, he qualified for the final ranking third. On the second day, he ranked fourteenth in the preliminaries of the 100 metre freestyle with a time of 48.92 seconds and did not advance to the semifinals as he was not one of the two fastest swimmers representing Italy. Later in the day, in the final of the 50 metre butterfly, he won the gold medal, finishing 0.08 seconds ahead of silver medalist Maxime Grousset of France with a time of 22.89 seconds. For his final event of the evening, he swam a 52.82 for the backstroke leg of the 4×100 metre mixed medley relay in the final, helping win the silver medal with a time of 3:43.61.

Finishing with a time of 24.69 seconds in the morning prelims heats of the 50 metre backstroke on day four, Ceccon qualified ranking first for the semifinals, joined by fellow Italian Michele Lamberti who ranked fifth. For the semifinals, he swam a 24.65 and qualified for the final ranking second. Concluding day four, he won a gold medal as part of the 4×100 metre freestyle relay, contributing a split time of 47.80 seconds for the second leg of the relay to the final time of 3:10.50. The following day, he won the silver medal in the 50 metre backstroke with an Italian record time of 24.40 seconds, finishing 0.04 seconds behind gold medalist Apostolos Christou of Greece. In the prelims heats of the 100 metre backstroke the next day, he ranked first with a time of 53.71 seconds and qualified for the semifinals. He ranked third in the semifinals and qualified for the final with a time of 53.48 seconds. For the final of the 100 metre backstroke, on the final day, he dropped his time down to 52.21 seconds and won the gold medal. Approximately 75 minutes later, he won a gold medal as part of the 4×100 metre medley relay, contributing a time of 52.82 for the backstroke leg of the relay to help set a new Championships record of 3:28.46.

2022 Swimming World Cup
Commencing the 2022 FINA Swimming World Cup in Berlin, Germany on day one, the first day of his first FINA Swimming World Cup, Ceccon won the gold medal in the 100 metre individual medley with a time of 51.52 seconds, finishing 0.10 seconds ahead of silver medalist Matthew Sates of South Africa. The following day, he achieved a silver medal in the 50 metre backstroke with a personal best time of 23.22 seconds, finishing less than one-tenth of a second behind gold medalist Dylan Carter of Trinidad and Tobago. On the third day, he won the silver medal in the 100 metre backstroke with his first Italian record in the short course 100 metre backstroke and a personal best time of 49.62 seconds, finishing 0.08 seconds behind 2021 World Short Course champion in the event Shaine Casas of the United States. Across all of his performances at the stop, he earned 52.6 points, ranking as the sixth highest-scoring male competitor, 0.8 points behind fifth-ranked Kyle Chalmers of Australia and 3.7 points ahead of seventh-ranked Shaine Casas.

Day one of stop two, held in Toronto, Canada, Ceccon finished in a time of 51.69 seconds in the final of the 100 metre individual medley to win the silver medal 0.66 seconds behind Shaine Casas. He snatched up another silver medal in the final of the 100 metre freestyle the following day, finishing 0.63 seconds behind gold medalist Kyle Chalmers and 0.17 seconds ahead of bronze medalist Brooks Curry of the United States in a personal best time of 46.15 seconds. For the 50 metre butterfly on day three, he won the bronze medal with a time of 22.60 seconds, sharing the podium with Dylan Carter (gold medalist) and Chad le Clos of South Africa (silver medalist).

The third and find stop, starting 3 November in Indianapolis, United States, Ceccon won his first medal of the stop on the second day of competition, achieving a time of 46.27 seconds in the final of the 100 metre freestyle to win the silver medal 0.72 seconds behind gold medalist Kyle Chalmers and 0.55 seconds ahead of bronze medalist Drew Kibler of the United States. Achieving a score of 144.8 points for the three stops of the World Cup circuit, he ranked as the seventh overall highest-scoring male competitor.

2022 World Short Course Championships
Ceccon placed nineteenth in the 50 metre butterfly on day one of the 2022 World Short Course Championships, held in December in Melbourne, Australia, with a time of 22.57 seconds. In the evening session, he anchored the 4×100 metre freestyle relay to a gold medal-win in a new world record time of 3:02.75 with a time of 45.13 seconds. For the final of the 100 metre freestyle on day three, he placed fifth with a personal best time of 45.72 seconds. He also won a silver medal in the 4×50 metre freestyle relay in the same session, splitting a 20.67 for the third leg of the relay to contribute to the final time of 1:23.48. On day four, he won his first individual gold medal in the 100 metre individual medley, finishing first with a personal best time of 50.97 seconds. He followed up with a 1:42.61 on the second leg of the 4×200 metre freestyle relay in the final to help achieve a new Italian record time of 6:49.63 and win the bronze medal.

On the morning of day five, Ceccon swam the butterfly leg of the 4×50 metre medley relay in the preliminaries, splitting a 21.80 to contribute to a first-ranked and final-qualifying time of 1:32.31. For the finals relay, Matteo Rivolta took his place for the butterfly leg and he won a gold medal for his efforts when the relay placed first with a time of 1:29.72. In the preliminaries of the 4×100 metre medley relay on the sixth and final day, he achieved a personal best time of 49.59 seconds on the backstroke leg of the relay and helped qualify the relay to the final ranking third in 3:23.81. He won a bronze medal when the finals relay, on which Lorenzo Mora took his place, finished third in a time of 3:19.06.

International championships (50 m)

 Ceccon swam only in the preliminaries.

International championships (25 m)

 Ceccon swam only in the preliminaries.

Personal best times

Long course metres (50 m pool)

Short course metres (25 m pool)

Swimming World Cup circuits
The following medals Ceccon has won at Swimming World Cup circuits.

World records

Long course metres (50 m pool)

Short course metres (25 m pool)

References

External links
 

Italian male swimmers
2001 births
Living people
People from Thiene
World record setters in swimming
World record holders in swimming
Swimmers at the 2018 Summer Youth Olympics
Swimmers at the 2020 Summer Olympics
Youth Olympic gold medalists for Italy
Medalists at the 2020 Summer Olympics
Olympic silver medalists for Italy
Olympic bronze medalists for Italy
Olympic silver medalists in swimming
Olympic bronze medalists in swimming
Italian male freestyle swimmers
Italian male backstroke swimmers
European Aquatics Championships medalists in swimming
Olympic swimmers of Italy
Medalists at the FINA World Swimming Championships (25 m)
World Aquatics Championships medalists in swimming
21st-century Italian people
Sportspeople from the Province of Vicenza